Dangdut is a genre of Indonesian folk music that is partly derived and fused from Hindustani, Arabic and to lesser extent, Malay and local folk music. Dangdut is a most popular musical genre in Indonesia and a very popular in other Malay world countries as well because of its melodious instrumentation and vocals. Dangdut features a tabla and gendang beat.

One of the most popular Dangdut musicians and singers such as Rhoma Irama, known as the "King of Dangdut"; Mansyur S.; Meggy Z; and Ellya Khadam include strong Indian-music influence in the basis of harmony, theme, and beat to their songs and also by other popular dangdut singers.

A dangdut band typically consists of a lead singer, male or female, backed by four to eight musicians. Instruments usually include a tabla, gendang, flute, mandolin, guitars, sitar, drum machines, and synthesizers. The term has been expanded from the desert-style music to embrace other musical styles. Modern dangdut incorporates influences from Middle Eastern pop music, Western rock, house music, hip hop music, disco music, contemporary R&B, and reggae.

The popularity of dangdut peaked in the 1990s. By 2012, it was still largely popular in the western parts of Indonesia, but the genre was becoming less popular in the eastern parts, apart from Maluku. Meanwhile more regional and faster-paced forms of dangdut (as opposed to slower, Bollywood-influenced dangdut) have risen in popularity.

Development 

The term dangdut is a onomatopoeia for the sound of the tabla (also known as gendang) drum, which is written dang and ndut. Putu Wijaya initially mentioned in the 27 May 1972, edition of Tempo magazine that the doll song from India was a mixture of Malay songs, desert rhythms, and Indian "dang-ding-dut". It was reportedly coined by music magazine Aktuil, although Rhoma Irama stated that it was coined as a term of derision by the rich to the music of the poor. Despite its derogatory intent, it was seized upon by those playing it, and the term appears in Rhoma's 1973 dangdut classic Terajana:

Sulingnya suling bambu - The flute, a bamboo flute
Gendangnya kulit lembu - The drum, from cow hide
Dangdut suara gendang rasa ingin berdendang - Dangdut's drum sound makes you want to sing

Dangdut as a term distinguished the music of Javanese people from the Orkes Melayu (Malay orchestra) of North Sumatran Malays. Besides orkes Melayu, the primary musical influence on dangdut was Indian Bollywood music (Filmi). The song "Terajana" pays homage to the 1959 Bollywood hit "Tera Jana Ke," and though dangdut is primarily written in the Indonesian language, respect was paid to the Indian influence. The next verse of "Terajana" is as follows:

Terajana... Terajana - Terajana, Terajana
Ini lagunya... lagu India - This is the song, song of India

Orkes Melayu singer Ellya Khadam switched to dangdut in the 1970s, and by 1972 she was the number one artist in Indonesia. Her success, with that of Rhoma Irama, meant that by 1975, 75 percent of all recorded music in Indonesia was of the dangdut genre, with pop bands such as Koes Plus adopting the style.

Culture 
Most major cities, especially on Java, have one or more venues that have a dangdut show several times a week. The concerts of major dangdut stars are also broadcast on television.

Beginning in 2003, certain dangdut musicians became the focus of a national controversy in Indonesia regarding performances by koplo dangdut singer Inul Daratista, which religious conservatives described as pornography. Protests led by dangdut megastar and devout Muslim Rhoma Irama called for Daratista to be banned from television, and legislation was passed in 2008 by the People's Consultative Assembly that introduced a broad range of activities described as pornography.

The flamboyant performances at some dangdut shows also attracted collateral attention in May 2012 when a row broke out in Indonesia over a planned performance by international star Lady Gaga in Jakarta due to be held in early June 2012. In the face of opposition from conservative Muslim groups in Indonesia, the planned show was canceled. This cancelation led numerous commentators to note that opposition to Lady Gaga's performances was surprising given the nature of some dangdut shows.

Dangdut remains an integral part of Indonesian life and pop culture despite conservative Muslim concerns over the supposed vulgarity of some performances (such as by Dewi Persik and Julia Perez).

Because of the popularity of the genre, some movies and TV shows have dangdut-centered themes, such as Rhoma Irama's movies and Rudy Soedjarwo's Mendadak Dangdut.

Gallery

See also 

Campursari
Gambus
Indo pop
Music of Indonesia
Music of Malaysia

References

Further reading

External links
Example of a dangdut song by Intan Ali

 
Dance music genres
Folk music genres
Indonesian folk music
Music of Sumatra